Oxidoreductase HTATIP2 is an enzyme that in humans is encoded by the HTATIP2 gene. It may be a metastasis suppressor.

References

Further reading